Mykola Ivanovych Murashko (20 May 1844, Glukhov, Chernigov Governorate, Russian Empire – 22 September 1909, Bucha, Kiev Governorate, Russian Empire) was a Ukrainian painter, art teacher, art critic and art historian, who belonged to promoters of the Russian movement of Peredvizhniki; he was a student and successor of painter Adrian Prakhov at the St. Petersburg Academy of Arts, the founder and the first director of his own private drawing school in Kyiv and memoirist.

Murashko was one of the best friends of Ukrainian painter Ilya Repin. His nephew Aleksandr Murashko was an artist and one of the first members of the National Academy of Arts of Ukraine.

Biography 
His father was an icon carver of Ukrainian descent. From an early age he showed an interest in art; copying pictures from books. In 1858, the family moved to Kyiv. Five years later, Ivan Soshenko, a teacher at the gymnasium, recommended that he pursue training in art. That same year, he began auditing classes at the Imperial Academy of Arts in Saint Petersburg.

Illness prevented him from completing his course of study and he settled in Voronezh, but continued to send works to the Academy. On this basis, he was certified as an art teacher and began his career in a local primary school in 1868. In 1879, the Academy named him an "Artist, 3rd Degree".

Over the years, he taught in several schools at different levels. From 1875 to 1901, he operated his own drawing school in Kyiv which was supported by many well known artists; notably Ilya Repin, a friend from the Academy. On his initiative, Kiev put on an annual art exhibition, beginning in 1877.

In the meantime, he produced numerous landscapes, many of which were purchased for the museum at the Academy. He also painted a few portraits and illustrated the first edition of Hans Christian Andersen's tales in the Imperial Russia.

Teaching, however, was always his priority and his students were given individual attention. In addition, he made numerous trips to Vienna, Paris, Rome and other notable art centers to study the latest teaching methods and wrote articles for a variety of local and national periodicals.

After the school closed, he retired to the village of Bucha and began to write "Memoirs of an Old Master". Two parts were published, but the book was never finished, due to illness.

Creative development 
In the late 70s, the artist paints landscapes diligently. All these works were highly appreciated and some were bought for the museum of the Academy of Arts. During the same period, the artist painted several portraits, the best of which is considered to be the portrait of Nikolai Ge. The portrait is painted in the traditions of Russian realistic painting, with great psychological expressiveness displays the image of the artist.

Often the artist turned to the image of the Dnipro expanses. The most characteristic and successful is his landscape "Over the Dnieper", which impresses by its realism and non-duality.

References

Further reading 
Nikolay Murashko: Киевская рисовальная школа. 1875-1901, С.В. Кульженко, 1907 (full text @ the Russian State Library digital archive)

External links 

1844 births
1909 deaths
People from Hlukhiv
People from Glukhovsky Uyezd
19th-century painters from the Russian Empire
19th-century Ukrainian painters
19th-century Ukrainian male artists
Ukrainian male painters
19th-century male artists from the Russian Empire
Landscape painters
Russian illustrators
Ukrainian illustrators
Art educators